Eburia cinereopilosa is a species of beetle in the family Cerambycidae found on Cuba and in the United States.

References

cinereopilosa
Beetles described in 1932